The Vienenburg–Goslar railway is a main line between Vienenburg and Goslar on the northern edge of the Harz mountains in Germany. It was opened in 1866.

Route 
The 12.8 kilometre long route is single-tracked between Vienenburg and Oker. For much of its way the line follows the river Oker. The section from Oker to Goslar has been doubled.

Operations 
The line is worked by regional trains on the Goslar–Vienenburg–Brunswick route. On the Goslar–Oker section there trains also run from Hanover and Kreiensen to Bad Harzburg.

References

Vienenburg-Goslar
Transport in the Harz
Railway lines opened in 1866
1866 establishments in Germany
Buildings and structures in Goslar (district)